Poshtkuh-e Mugui Rural District is a rural district (dehestan) in the Central District of Fereydunshahr County, Isfahan Province, Iran. At the 2006 census, its population was 4,747, in 897 families.  The rural district has 30 villages.

References 

Rural Districts of Isfahan Province
Fereydunshahr County